Sunny Kathleen Franco (born 10 June 1997) is an Australian women's soccer player who plays for Newcastle Jets in the Australian W-League.

Club career
Queensland is known to have been producing players of calibre for the Matildas, from Sue Monteath to current captain, Clare Polkinghorne. Sunny Franco has retained this legacy as Matildas captain under the U17 contingent.

While the team is gearing up for the AFC U16s Girls Championships, Franco is headed for doubling as a World Cup qualifier and a major contender to represent Australia. The sixteen year player has fortified her position within the past year by producing remarkable goal scores in the Championship qualifiers last November in Manila.

Fast and quick to react, her yielding skill has been a result of her hard work training with a coach and undergoing a vigorous sprint-training. An aggressive midfielder reminding one of fellow Queenslander Tameka Butt, she is noted for her "pace, confidence on the ball, vision, technical ability, physicality and an eye for goal".

Brisbane Roar
In October 2014 she scored her first W-League goal against Melbourne. A month later she scored six goals in the AFC U-19 qualifier for Australia.

In October 2016, Franco returned to Brisbane Roar.

Manly United
Franco joined Manly United in April 2017.

Western Sydney Wanderers
Franco joined Western Sydney Wanderers ahead of the 2017–18 season.

Newcastle Jets
Franco returned to the W-League in December 2020, joining Newcastle Jets

Return to Brisbane Roar
In March 2021, following the conclusion of the 2020–21 W-League regular season, Franco joined Brisbane Roar ahead of the finals series.

Return to Newcastle Jets
Following the finals series of the 2020–21 W-League season, Franco returned Newcastle Jets, signing with them for the 2021–22 W-League season.

References

External links

1997 births
Living people
Australian women's soccer players
Brisbane Roar FC (A-League Women) players
Sydney FC (A-League Women) players
Western Sydney Wanderers FC (A-League Women) players
Newcastle Jets FC (A-League Women) players
A-League Women players
Women's association football midfielders